The Men's 1500 metre freestyle competition of the 2022 FINA World Swimming Championships (25 m) was held on 13 December 2022.

Records
Prior to the competition, the existing world and championship records were as follows.

Results
The slowest heats were started at 13:36, and the fastest heat at 20:55.

References

Men's 1500 metre freestyle